Ocoee dams refers to three hydroelectric generating facilities in Tennessee operated by the Tennessee Valley Authority:

See also
 Ocoee (disambiguation)